Denaeantha nivigera is a species of moth of the family Tortricidae. It is found on Java.

References

Moths described in 1941
Phricanthini